Naples Adventist Christian School is a co-educational Christian K-8 school located in Naples, Florida. The school was established in 1975  and is part of the international Seventh-day Adventist school system. The Naples Adventist Christian School is supported by the Naples Seventh-day Adventist church and strives to provide a spiritually oriented education for children. The Naples Adventist Christian School operates under the direction and accreditation of the Florida Conference Department of Education in the Southern Union of the North American Seventh-day Adventist Church.

Curriculum
The schools curriculum consists primarily of the standard courses taught at Elementary Schools and college preparatory schools across the world. All students are required to take classes in the core areas of English, Basic Sciences, Mathematics, and Social Sciences. In addition, religion classes are mandated on a yearly basis.

Accreditation
Naples Adventist Christian School is accredited by Middle States Association of Colleges and Schools (MSA/CESS) and is  accredited by the Board of Regents of the General Conference of Seventh-day Adventists, and the National Council for Private School Accreditation.

Athletics
Naples Adventist Christian School's athletic programs include:

Flag Football (boys)
Soccer (boys & girls)
Volleyball (boys & girls)
Softball (boys & girls)

Students
The student population is around 100. Upon graduation, many students continue their education at Greater Miami Adventist Academy. In years past there has been an increase in the number students attending as the population has gradually gone up in South West Florida area.

See also

 List of Seventh-day Adventist secondary schools
 Seventh-day Adventist education

References

External links

Private high schools in Florida
Educational institutions established in 1975
1975 establishments in Florida
Private elementary schools in Florida
Adventist secondary schools in the United States
Schools in Collier County, Florida